United Nations Security Council resolution 762, adopted unanimously on 30 June 1992, after reaffirming resolutions 713 (1991), 721 (1991), 724 (1991), 727 (1992), 740 (1992) 743 (1992), 749 (1992), 752 (1992), 757 (1992), 758 (1992), 760 (1992) and 761 (1992), the Council urged all parties to honour their commitments to the United Nations plan in former Yugoslavia and complete a cessation of hostilities.

It also urged Croatia to withdraw its army from its recent offensive in Dalmatia to positions held before 21 June 1992, and urged the remaining units of the Yugoslav People's Army as well as the Serbian territorial defence forces in Croatia, and also the irregular forces to strictly comply with the United Nations peacekeeping plan.

Resolution 762 also recommended the establishment of a Joint Commission, consisting of representatives of the Croatian government and local Serbs, which should consult "if necessary or appropriate" with the authorities in Belgrade as to its functions regarding the monitoring of police authorities and the withdrawal of both armies from the United Nations Protected Areas and "pink zones" outside of United Nations control. It also authorised an increase of 120 civilian police and 60 military officers to the United Nations Protection Force.

Reaffirming the arms embargo and the consequences that the collapse of the United Nations plan in Yugoslavia could have, the Council called on all parties again to co-operate with the Conference on Yugoslavia with its aim to reaching a political settlement consistent with the principles of the Organization for Security and Co-operation in Europe.

Croatia did not comply and did not withdraw its army.

See also
 Breakup of Yugoslavia
 Bosnian War
 Croatian War of Independence
 List of United Nations Security Council Resolutions 701 to 800 (1991–1993)
 Slovenian Independence War
 Yugoslav Wars

References

External links
 
Text of the Resolution at undocs.org

 0762
 0762
1992 in Yugoslavia
1992 in Bosnia and Herzegovina
1992 in Croatia
 0762
June 1992 events